Molino is a  of the  of Messina in the Province of Messina, Sicily, southern Italy. It stands at an elevation of 222 metres above sea level. At the time of the Istat census of 2001 it had 212 inhabitants.

See also 
 2009 northeastern Sicily floods and mudslides

External links 
 Il Sito di Molino  (in Italian)

Frazioni of the Metropolitan City of Messina